The 1830s (pronounced "eighteen-thirties") was a decade of the Gregorian calendar that began on January 1, 1830, and ended on December 31, 1839.

In this decade, the world saw a rapid rise of imperialism and colonialism, particularly in Asia and Africa. Britain saw a surge of power and world dominance, as Queen Victoria took to the throne in 1837. Conquests took place all over the world, particularly around the expansion of the Ottoman Empire and the British Raj. New outposts and settlements flourished in Oceania, as Europeans began to settle over Australia and New Zealand.

Politics

Pacific
 July 30, 1836 – The first English language newspaper is published in Hawaii.
 1838 – The Pitcairn Islands become a Crown colony of the United Kingdom; and women there are the first in the world to be granted and maintain, another one women's suffrage.

East Asia

China 

China was ruled by the Daoguang Emperor of the Qing dynasty during the 1830s. The decade witnessed a rapid rise in the sale of opium in China, despite efforts by the Daoguang Emperor to end the trade. A turning point came in 1834, with the end of the monopoly of the British East India Company, leaving trade in the hands of private entrepreneurs. By 1838, opium sales climbed to 40,000 chests. In 1839, newly appointed imperial commissioner Lin Zexu banned the sale of opium and imposed several restrictions on all foreign traders. Lin also closed the channel to Guangzhou (Canton), leading to the seizure and destruction of 20,000 chests of opium. The British retaliated, seizing Hong Kong on August 23 of that year, starting what would be known as the First Opium War.  It would end three years later with the signing of the Treaty of Nanking in 1842.

Japan 
 July 1837 – Charles W. King sets sail on the American merchant ship Morrison. In the Morrison Incident, he is turned away from Japanese ports with cannon fire.

Southeastern Asia 
 1830 – The Java War ends.
 1833 – H.R.H. Prince Mongkut of Siam founds the Dhammayut Buddhist reform movement.

Dutch East Indies 
The Padri War was fought from 1803 until 1837 in West Sumatra between the Padris and the Adats.  The latter asked for the help of the Dutch, who intervened from 1821 and helped the Adats defeat the Padri faction.  The conflict intensified in the 1830s, as the war soon centered on Bonjol, the fortified last stronghold of the Padris. It finally fell in 1837 after being besieged for three years, and along with the exile of Padri leader Tuanku Imam Bonjol, the conflict died out.

Vietnam 
 1839 – The Emperor Minh Mạng renames Việt Nam to Đai Nam.

Australia and New Zealand 
 The various Maori chieftains of Northland region of North Island proclaim their independence as the United Tribes of New Zealand, under the guidance of James Bubsby. The British Crown immediately recognizes their claim.
 August 15, 1834 – The South Australia Act allows for the creation of a colony there.
 June 8, 1835 – The Australian city of Melbourne is founded by John Batman and John Pascoe Fawkner.
 October 28, 1835 – United Tribes of New Zealand founded at Waitangi with the Declaration of the Independence of New Zealand.
 November 19, 1835 – A force of 500 Māori people invade and enslave the peoples of the Chatham Islands.
 July 27, 1836 – Adelaide, South Australia, is founded.
 December 26, 1836 – The colony of South Australia is officially proclaimed (now celebrated in the state of South Australia as Proclamation Day).
 December 28, 1836 – Colony of South Australia founded by Captain John Hindmarsh
 June 10, 1838 – 28 Indigenous Australians are killed in the Myall Creek Massacre.
 1838 – Five nuns from the Religious Sisters of Charity in Ireland become the first women of religion to set foot on Australian soil.

Southern Asia 
 December 1838 – First Anglo-Afghan War: British and Presidency armies set out from Punjab in support of Shah Shujah Durrani's claim to the throne of Afghanistan.

India 

The British government appointed a series of administrative heads of British India in the 1830s ("Governor-General of India" starting in 1833): Lord William Bentinck (1828–1835), Sir Charles Metcalfe, Bt (1835–1836), and The Lord Auckland (1836–1842).  The Government of India Act 1833 was enacted to remove the East India Company's remaining trade monopolies and divested it of all its commercial functions, renewing the company's political and administrative authority for another twenty years.  It invested the Board of Control with full power and authority over the company.

The English Education Act by the Council of India in 1835 reallocated funds from the East India Company to spend on education and literature in India.  In 1837, the British East India company replaced Persian with local vernacular in various provinces as the official and court language.  However, in the northern regions of the Indian subcontinent, Urdu instead of Hindi was chosen to replace Persian.

In 1835, William Henry Sleeman captured "Feringhea" in his efforts to suppress the Thuggee secret society.  Sleeman's work led to his appointment as General Superintendent of the operations for the Suppression of Thuggee.  In February 1839, he assumed charge of the office of Commissioner for the Suppression of Thuggee and Dacoity. During these operations, more than 1400 Thugs were hanged or transported for life.

Western Asia 
 1831 – Muhammad Ali of Egypt's French-trained forces occupy Syria.
 May 10, 1832 – The Egyptians, aided by Maronites, seize Acre from the Ottoman Empire after a 7-month siege.
 December 21, 1832 – Battle of Konya: The Egyptians defeat the main Ottoman army in central Anatolia.
 September 1, 1836 – Rebuilding begins at the Hurva Synagogue in Jerusalem.
 January 19, 1839 – The British East India Company captures Aden.
 July 23, 1839 – First Anglo-Afghan War, 1839 – Battle of Ghazni: British forces capture the fortress city of Ghazni, Afghanistan.

Eastern Europe

Poland 
 November 29, 1830 – The Polish insurrection begins in Warsaw against Russian rule.
 February 20, 1831 – Battle of Grochow: Polish rebel forces divide a Russian army.
 May 26, 1831 – Battle of Ostrołęka: The Poles fight another indecisive battle.
 September 6 – September 8, 1831 – Battle of Warsaw: The Russians take the Polish capital and crush resistance.

Northern Europe

United Kingdom

Royalty 

In 1830, William IV succeeded his brother George IV as King of the United Kingdom.  Upon his death in 1837, his 18-year-old niece Queen Victoria acceded to the throne. where she would reign for more than 63 years. Under Salic law, the Kingdom of Hanover passed to William's brother, Ernest Augustus, Duke of Cumberland, ending the personal union of Britain and Hanover which had persisted since 1714.  Queen Victoria took up residence in Buckingham Palace, the first reigning British monarch to make this, rather than St James's Palace, her London home.

Politics and law 
Britain had four prime ministers during the 1830s.  As the decade began, Tory Arthur Wellesley, 1st Duke of Wellington led parliament.  Wellington's government fell in late 1830, failing to react to calls for reform. The Whigs selected Charles Grey, 2nd Earl Grey to succeed him, who led passage of many reforms, including the Reform Act 1832, the Slavery Abolition Act 1833 (abolishing slavery throughout the British Empire), and the Factory Acts (limiting child labour).

In 1834 Grey retired from public life, leaving Lord Melbourne as his successor. Reforms continued under Lord Melbourne, with the  Poor Law Amendment Act in 1834, which stated that no able-bodied British man could receive assistance unless he entered a workhouse.  King William IV's opposition to the Whigs' reforming ways led him to dismiss Melbourne in November and then appoint Sir Robert Peel to form a Tory government. Peel's failure to win a House of Commons majority in the resulting general election (January 1835) made it impossible for him to govern, and the Whigs returned to power under Melbourne in April 1835.  The Marriage Act 1836 established civil marriage and registration systems that permit marriages in nonconformist chapels, and a Registrar General of Births, Marriages, and Deaths.

There were protests and significant unrest during the decade.  In May and June 1831 in Wales, coal miners and others rioted for improved working conditions in what was known as the Merthyr Rising. William Howley Archbishop of Canterbury has his coach attacked by an angry mob on his first official visit to Canterbury in 1832.  In 1834, Robert Owen organized the Grand National Consolidated Trades Union, an early attempt to form a national union confederation.  In May 1838, the People's Charter was drawn up in the United Kingdom, demanding universal suffrage.  Chartism continued to gain popularity, leading to the Newport Rising in 1839, the last large-scale armed rebellion against authority in mainland Britain.

In 1835, James Pratt and John Smith were hanged outside Newgate Prison in London after a conviction of sodomy, the last deadly victims of the judicial persecution of homosexual men in England.

Western Europe

Germany 
 May 30, 1832 – Germany: Hambacher Fest, a demonstration for civil liberties and national unity, ends with no result.
 December 14, 1833 – Kaspar Hauser, a mysterious German youth, is stabbed, dying three days later on December 17.
 January 1, 1834 – Zollverein: Customs charges are abolished at borders within Germany.
 October 13, 1836 – Theodor Fliedner, a Lutheran minister, and Friederike, his wife, open the Deaconess Home and Hospital at Kaiserswerth, Germany, as an institute to train women in nursing.
 The 5th century BC Berlin Foundry Cup is acquired for the Antikensammlung Berlin in Germany.

Austria 
 March 2, 1835 – Ferdinand becomes Emperor of Austria.

Switzerland 
 October – Start of the Regeneration in Switzerland: more liberal constitutions adopted in most cantons.
 August 3, 1833 – In Switzerland, troops of the city of Basel march on rebels in Liestal, but are beaten back at the Battle of Hülftenschanz.
 August 26, 1833 – The Canton of Basel is partitioned by the Swiss Tagsatzung, to create the two half-cantons of Basel-City and Basel-Country.

Belgium 

 August 25, 1830 – The Belgian Revolution begins.
 September 27, 1830 – The Belgian Revolution ends by liberating Brussels from the United Kingdom of the Netherlands.
 October 4, 1830 – The Provisional Government in Brussels declares the creation of the independent state of Belgium, in revolt against the United Kingdom of the Netherlands.
 December 20, 1830 – The independence of Belgium is recognized by the Great Powers.
 July 21, 1831 – Leopold I of Belgium is inaugurated as first king of the Belgians.
 August 2, 1831 – The Dutch ten-day campaign in Belgium is halted by a French army.
 December 4, 1832 – Battle of Antwerp: The last remaining Dutch enforcement, the citadel, is under French attack.
 December 23, 1832 – The Battle of Antwerp ends with the Netherlands losing the city.
 1839 – Half of the Limburg province of Belgium is added to the Netherlands (since 1839 there is a Belgian Limburg and Dutch Limburg).
 April 19, 1839 – The Treaty of London establishes Belgium as a kingdom.

France

French Revolution of 1830 
It saw the overthrow of King Charles X, the French Bourbon monarch, and the ascent of his brother Louis, Duke of Orléans (who would in turn be overthrown in 1848). The revolution ended the Bourbon Restoration, shifting power to the July Monarchy (rule by the House of Orléans). Duc de Broglie briefly served as State Minister, with many successors over the course of 2 years.

Canut revolts 
The first two Canut revolts occurred in the 1830s. They were among the first well-defined worker uprisings of the Industrial Revolution. The word Canut was a common term to describe to all Lyonnais silk workers.

The First Canut revolt in 1831 was provoked by a drop in workers' wages caused by a drop in silk prices. After a bloody battle with the military causing 600 casualties, rebellious silk workers seize Lyon, France. The government sent Marshal Jean-de-Dieu Soult, a veteran of the Napoleonic Wars, at the head of an army of 20,000 to restore order. Soult was able to retake the town without any bloodshed, and without making any compromises with the workers.  The Second Canut revolt in 1834 occurred when owners attempted to impose a wage decrease. The government crushed the rebellion in a bloody battle, and deported or imprisoned 10,000 insurgents.

Other events 
 June 5 – 6, 1832 – France: June Rebellion, anti-monarchist riots, chiefly by students, in Paris.
 1835 – The French word for their language changes to français, from françois.

Southern Europe

Ottoman Empire (Balkans) 

 March 29, 1831 – The Great Bosnian uprising against the Ottoman Empire breaks out.
 April – Sultan Mahmud II of the Ottoman Empire dies.
 July 1, 1839 – Abd-ul-Mejid I (1839–1861) succeeds Mahmud II (1808–1839) as Ottoman Emperor.
 1839 – The United Kingdom of Great Britain and Ireland, backed by the Russian Empire and the Austrian Empire, compels July Monarchy France to abandon Muhammad Ali of Egypt, and it forces him to return Syria and Arabia to the Ottoman Empire.
 1839 – Tanzimat starts in the Ottoman Empire.

Greece 
 February 3, 1830 – Greece is liberated from the Ottoman forces as the final result of the Greek War of Independence.
 July 20, 1830 – Greece grants citizenship to Jews.
 May 7, 1832 – The Treaty of London creates an independent Kingdom of Greece. Otto of Wittelsbach, Prince of Bavaria, is chosen King. Thus begins the history of modern Greece.
 May 11, 1832 – Greece is recognized as a sovereign nation; the Treaty of Constantinople ends the Greek War of Independence in July.
 1833 – Greece recaptures the Acropolis.
 June 7, 1834 – Greek independence: General Theodoros Kolokotronis is sentenced to death for treason for resisting the rule of Otto of Greece (he is released next year).
 1834 – Athens becomes Greece's capital city.

Italian Peninsula 

 November 8, 1830 – Ferdinand II becomes King of the Two Sicilies.
 February–March 1831 – Revolts in Modena, Parma and the Papal States are put down by Austrian troops.
 April 27, 1831 – Charles Albert becomes king of Sardinia after the death of King Charles Felix.
 1834 – A pro-republic uprising fails in Piedmont; one of the activists is Giuseppe Garibaldi.
 October 3, 1839 – In the Kingdom of the Two Sicilies, a railway between Naples and Portici (7.4 km length) is inaugurated by H.M. King Ferdinand II of Bourbon (the first railway in the Italian peninsula).

Spain 
 September 29, 1833 – Three-year-old Isabella II becomes Queen of Spain, under the regency of her mother, Maria Cristina of Bourbon-Two Sicilies. Her uncle Don Carlos, Conde de Molina challenges her claim, beginning the First Carlist War.
 July 15, 1834 – The Spanish Inquisition, which began in the 15th century, is suppressed by royal decree.
 September 1837 – Battle of Aranzueque: Liberal victory for the forces loyal to Queen Isabel II of Spain, end of the Carlist campaign known as the Expedición Real – The First Carlist War.
 October 1, 1838 – Supporters of Infante Carlos, Count of Molina, are victorious in the Battle of Maella during the First Carlist War.
 August 31, 1839 – The First Carlist war (Spain) ends with the Convenio de Vergara, also known as the Abrazo de Vergara ("the embrace in Vergara"; Bergara in Basque), between liberal general Baldomero Espartero, Count of Luchana and Carlist General Rafael Maroto.

Portugal 
 July 5, 1833 – Liberal Wars, 1833 – Battle of Cape St. Vincent: The forces of Queen Maria II of Portugal win decisively.
 July 24, 1834 – The Liberal Wars end in Portugal.
 January 26, 1835 – Queen Maria II of Portugal marries Auguste de Beauharnais, 2nd Duke of Leuchtenberg, in Lisbon; he dies only two months later.
 January 1, 1836 – Queen Maria II of Portugal marries Prince Ferdinand Augustus Francis Anthony of Saxe-Coburg-Gotha.

Africa 
 Egba refugees fleeing the Yoruba civil wars found the city of Abeokuta in south-west Nigeria.
 February 14, 1831 – Battle of Debre Abbay: Ras Marye of Yejju marches into Tigray and defeats and kills the warlord Sabagadis.
 1831 – Rifa'a el-Tahtawi returns from study in Paris to Egypt.
 December 11, 1834 – The Sixth Xhosa War is characterized by severe clashes between white settlers and Bantu peoples in Cape Colony; Dutch-speaking settlers colonize the area north of Orange River.
 February 1, 1835 – Slavery is abolished in Mauritius.
 October 10 – October 13, 1837 – The French army besieges and captures Constantine in French Algeria.
 December 16, 1838 – The Boers win a decisive victory over the Zulus in the Battle of Blood River.

French conquest of Algeria 

In 1830, France invaded and quickly seized Ottoman Regency of Algiers, and rapidly took control of other coastal communities. Fighting would continue throughout the decade, with the French pitted against forces under Ahmed Bey at Constantine, primarily in the east, and nationalist forces in Kabylie and the west.  The French made treaties with the nationalists under 'Abd al-Qādir, enabling them to capture Constantine in 1837.  Al-Qādir continued to give stiff resistance in the west, which lasted throughout the decade (and well into the 1840s, with Al-Qādir surrendering in 1847).

North America

Canada 
 May 30, 1832 – Canada: The Rideau Canal in eastern Ontario is opened.
 March 6, 1834 – York, Upper Canada, is incorporated as Toronto.
 November–December 1837 – In the Canadas, William Lyon Mackenzie leads the Upper Canada Rebellion and Louis-Joseph Papineau leads the Lower Canada Rebellion.
 May 1838 – Lord Durham and his entourage arrive in Upper Canada to investigate the cause of the 1837 rebellion in that province. This leads to Durham submitting the Durham Report to Britain.

United States

Slavery 
 January 1, 1831 – William Lloyd Garrison begins publishing The Liberator, an antislavery newspaper, in Boston, Massachusetts.
 August 21, 1831 – USA: Nat Turner's slave rebellion breaks out in Southampton County, Virginia.
 September 19, 1835 – William Lloyd Garrison publishes Angelina Grimké's anti-slavery letter in The Liberator.
 November 7, 1837 – American abolitionist and newspaper editor Elijah Lovejoy is killed by a pro-slavery mob, at his warehouse in Alton, Illinois.
 July 1, 1839 – Slaves aboard the Amistad rebel and capture the ship off the coast of Cuba.  Under direction to sail the ship to Africa, the crew sailed the ship to Long Island, New York, where the slaves were taken into custody by the U.S. Navy.  The slaves would later win the right to return to Africa in United States v. The Amistad.

Settlement 
 February 9, 1832 – The Florida Legislative Council grants a city charter for Jacksonville, Florida.
 July 10, 1832 – U.S. Survey of the Coast revived (with US Department of Treasury).
 August 12, 1833 – The city of Chicago is established at the estuary of the Chicago River by 350 settlers.
 March 11, 1834 – U.S. Survey of the Coast transferred to the Department of the Navy.
 March 27, 1836 – United States Survey of the Coast returned to U.S. Treasury Department; renamed U.S. Coastal Survey.
 April 20, 1836 – The Territory of Wisconsin is created.
 June 15, 1836 – Arkansas is the 25th state admitted into the United States.
 January 26, 1837 – Michigan becomes the 26th state admitted to the United States.

Native Americans 

 May 28, 1830 – The United States Congress passes the Indian Removal Act.
 April 6, 1832 – The Black Hawk War begins.
 July 9, 1832 – Commissioner of Indian Affairs post created within the War Department.
 August 2, 1832 – Bad Axe Massacre ends the last major Native American rebellion east of the Mississippi in the U.S.
 1832 – George Catlin starts to live among the Sioux in the Dakota Territory.
 1832 – The federal government establishes a smallpox vaccination program for Native Americans (The Indian Vaccination Act of 1832).
 July 29, 1834 – Office of Indian Affairs organized in the United States.
 December 28, 1835 – USA: The Second Seminole War breaks out.
 December 29, 1835 – The Treaty of New Echota is signed between the United States Government and members of the Cherokee Nation.
 1835 – Fort Cass is established, the military headquarters and site of the largest internment camps during the 1838 Trail of Tears.
 May 19, 1836 – Fort Parker massacre: Among those captured by Native Americans is nine-year-old Cynthia Ann Parker; she later gives birth to a son named Quanah, who becomes the last chief of the Comanche.
 1836 – George Catlin ends his 6-year tour of 50 tribes in the Dakota Territory.
 February 4, 1837 – Seminoles attack Fort Foster in Florida.
 May 26, 1838 – USA: The people of the Cherokee Nation are forcibly relocated during the Trail of Tears.

Presidents 
 December 3, 1832 – U.S. presidential election, 1832: Andrew Jackson is re-elected president.
 March 4, 1833 – Andrew Jackson is sworn in for his second term as President of the United States.
 May 6, 1833 – In Alexandria, Virginia, the first public physical attack on an American President, with Andrew Jackson struck by a disgruntled Robert B. Randolph, who was dismissed from the navy by Jackson for embezzlement. Though the assailant was immediately apprehended, Jackson decided not to press charges. 
 March 27, 1834 – Andrew Jackson is censured by the Congress of the United States (expunged in 1837).
 January 30, 1835 – An assassination is attempted against President Andrew Jackson in the United States Capitol (the first assassination attempt against a President of the United States).
 December 7, 1835 – Future U.S. President James K. Polk becomes Speaker of the House
 December 4, 1836 – Whig Party holds its first national convention, in Harrisburg, Pennsylvania.
 December 7, 1836 – 1836 United States presidential election: Martin Van Buren defeats William Henry Harrison.
 March 4, 1837 – Martin Van Buren succeeds Andrew Jackson as President of the United States.

Supreme Court 
 January 12 – January 27, 1830 – Robert Y. Hayne of South Carolina debates the question of states' rights vs. federal authority with Daniel Webster of Massachusetts in the United States Congress.
 March 12, 1830 – Craig vs. Missouri: The United States Supreme Court rules that state loan certificates are unconstitutional because they were bills of credit emitted by a state in violation of Article I, Section 10 of the Constitution.

Other 
 November 14, 1832 – Charles Carroll, the last surviving signer of the Declaration of Independence dies at his home in Maryland at age 95.
 April 14, 1834 – The Whig Party is officially named by United States Senator Henry Clay.
 August 11 – August 12, 1834 – Ursuline Convent Riots: A convent of Ursuline nuns is burned near Boston.
 January 8, 1835 – The United States public debt contracts to $0 for the only time in history
 1835 – Edward Strutt Abdy publishes his Journal of a Residence and Tour in the United States of North America: From April, 1833, to October 1834.
 May 10, 1837 – The Panic of 1837 begins in New York City.
 June 11, 1837 – The Broad Street Riot occurs in Boston, Massachusetts, fueled by ethnic tensions between the Irish and the Yankees.
 1839 – the first state law permitting women to own property is passed in Jackson, Mississippi.

Texas War of Independence (Texas Revolution) 
 October 2, 1835 – Province of Tejas, Northern Mexico, – Battle of Gonzales: Under orders from Mexican President-turned dictator, General Antonio López de Santa Anna, Mexican soldiers attempt to capture a cannon that the Mexican government had earlier provided to the settlers of Gonzales, Texas for  protection against hostile Indians, but encounter stiff resistance from a hastily assembled militia. This became known as the "Come-and-Take-it" skirmish.
 December 9, 1835 – Texian "army" volunteers, under General Burleson, capture the town of San Antonio de Bejar from the Mexican forces occupying the town under General Martin Perfecto de Cos.
 December 20, 1835 – A Texas Declaration of Independence is first signed at Goliad, Texas.
 January 5, 1836 – David Crockett arrives in Texas.
 February 23, 1836 – The Siege of the Alamo begins, with a Texian army under the command of Lt Colonel Willam B. Travis and volunteers under Colonel James Bowie, hastily fortifying and defending the Alamo against the Mexican Army under Santa Anna.
 March 1, 1836 – Convention of 1836: Delegates from several Texian settlements gather in Washington-on-the-Brazos, Texas, to deliberate and vote on independence from Mexico.
 March 2 – Convention of 1836: The Texas Declaration of Independence is signed by 60 delegates and the Republic of Texas is declared. Sam Houston is elected as Commanding General of the Texian "Army".

 March 6, 1836 – The Battle of the Alamo ends the 13-day siege; approximately 200 defenders (Anglo settlers & Tejano townsfolk) die in a fierce struggle with approximately 5,000 Mexican soldiers.
 March 17, 1836 – Convention of 1836: Delegates adopt the Constitution of the Republic of Texas, modeled after the United States Constitution.  It allows slavery, requires free blacks to petition Congress to live in the country, but prohibits import of slaves from anywhere but the United States. 
 March 27, 1836 – On Palm Sunday, 342 Texian prisoners captured a week earlier are shot and killed in the Goliad Massacre along with Texian Colonel James Walker Fannin by Mexican troops in Goliad near the Presidio La Bahia during the Texas Revolution.
 April 21, 1836 – Battle of San Jacinto: Mexican forces under General Santa Anna are defeated in a battle lasting 18 minutes by the San Jacinto River, Texas. (General Houston is wounded during the battle, and is later relieved of command by interim President David G. Burnet. This action enables Houston to recover from his wounds.)
 April 22, 1836 – Forces under Texian General Sam Houston capture Mexican General Antonio López de Santa Anna who had attempted to escape during the chaos of the battle the previous day. Capturing Santa Anna guarantees Texas independence from Mexico.

Republic of Texas 
January 3, 1834 – The government of Mexico imprisons Stephen F. Austin in Mexico City.
August 30, 1836 – The city of Houston, Texas, is founded.
 September 5, 1836 – Sam Houston is elected as the first president of the Republic of Texas.
 October 22, 1836 – Sam Houston is inaugurated as first elected President of the Republic of Texas.
 June 5, 1837 – The city of Houston, is incorporated by the Republic of Texas.

Mexico 
The 1830s for Mexico saw the end of the First Mexican Republic and saw General Santa Anna move in and out of the presidency in a 30-year span now known as the "Age of Santa Anna". In 1834, President Antonio López de Santa Anna dissolved Congress, forming a new government.  That government instituted the  Centralist Republic of Mexico by approving a new centralist constitution ("Siete Leyes"). From its formation in 1835 until its dissolution in 1846, the Centralist Republic was governed by eleven presidents (none of which finished their term). It called for the state militias to disarm, but many states resisted, including Mexican Texas, which declared independence in the Texas Revolution of 1836. During the 1840s, other provinces separated. The Republic of the Rio Grande in 1840, and the Republic of Yucatán declared independence in 1841.

May 23, 1835 – The Mexican State of Aguascalientes is formed by decree of President Santa Anna.
December 28, 1836 – Spain recognizes the independence of Mexico.
 May 1838 – An insurrection breaks out in Tizimín, beginning the campaign for the independence of Yucatan from Mexico.
 November 1838 – The Pastry War (also known as the First French intervention in Mexico) began with the naval blockade of some Mexican ports and the capture of the fortress of San Juan de Ulúa in Veracruz by French forces sent by King Louis-Philippe. The intervention followed many claims by French nationals of losses due to unrest in Mexico City, as well as the failure of Mexico to pay a large debt to France.
 March 1839 – The Pastry War ends with a British-brokered peace.

Nicaragua 
 April 30, 1838 – Nicaragua declares independence from the Central American Federation (see Nicaragua's early history).

Costa Rica 
 May 5, 1835 – Braulio Carrillo is sworn in as Head of State of Costa Rica.
 May 28, 1838 – Braulio Carrillo is sworn in as Head of State of Costa Rica, thus beginning his second term in office.

Puerto Rico 
 May 7, 1836 – The settlement of Mayagüez, Puerto Rico, is elevated to the royal status of villa by the government of Spain.

Honduras 
 November 5, 1838 – The Central American Civil War begins with Honduras' separation from the Central American Federation.

The Caribbean

Jamaica 
27 December, 1831 - Sam Sharpe leads a major slave rebellion, also known as the Baptist War. The slave uprising lasted for 10 days and spread throughout the entire island, mobilizing as many as 60,000 of Jamaica's enslaved population. The British colonial government used the armed Jamaican military forces and warriors from the towns of the Jamaican Maroons to put down the rebellion, suppressing it within two weeks. Some 14 whites were killed by armed slave battalions, but more than 200 slaves were killed by troops.

South America

Brazil 
 April 7, 1831 – Pedro I abdicates as emperor of Brazil in favor of his 5-year-old son Pedro II, who will reign for almost 59 years.
 November 7, 1831 – Slave trading is forbidden in Brazil.
 1834 – In the Empire of Brazil, the Additional Act provides:
 Establishment of the Provincial Legislative Assembly
 Extinction of the State Council
 Replacement of the Regency Trina
 Introduction of a direct and secret ballot.
 January 24, 1835 - a major slave rebellion known as the Malê revolt takes place in Salvador da Bahia.

Riograndense Republic 
 September 20, 1835 – Ragamuffin War begins in Rio Grande do Sul, Brazil.
 September 11, 1836 – Rio-Grandense Republic is proclaimed in South America.

Uruguay 
 July 18, 1830 – Uruguay adopts its first constitution.
 1835 – Civil war erupts in Uruguay between supporters of Blanco and Colorado parties.

Argentina 
 1835 – Juan Manuel de Rosas becomes Caudillo of Argentina.

Falkland Islands 
 January 3, 1833 – Britain retakes the Falkland Islands in the South Atlantic.

Peru 
 January 20, 1839 – Battle of Yungay: Chile defeats the Peruvian-Bolivian Confederation, leading to the restoration of an independent Peru.

Ecuador 
 May 13, 1830 – Ecuador separates from Gran Colombia.
 February 12, 1832 – Ecuador annexes the Galapagos Islands.

Chile 
 May 25, 1833 – The Chilean Constitution of 1833 is promulgated.

Science and technology

Astronomy 
 Robert's Quartet, a group of galaxies, is discovered.
 March 14, 1834 – John Herschel discovers the open cluster of stars now known as NGC 3603, observing from the Cape of Good Hope.
 May 15, 1836 – Francis Baily, during an eclipse of the sun, observes the phenomenon named after him as Baily's beads.
 1838 – Friedrich Bessel makes the first accurate measurement of distance to a star.
 1839 – The first parallax measurement of the distance to Alpha Centauri is published by Thomas Henderson.

Mechanical Engineering 
 July 17, 1830 – Barthélemy Thimonnier is granted a patent (#7454) for a sewing machine in France; it chains stitches at 200/minute.
 August 31, 1830 – Edwin Beard Budding is granted a patent for the invention of the lawnmower.
 February 25, 1836 – Samuel Colt receives a United States patent for the Colt revolver, the first revolving barrel multishot firearm.
 February 24, 1839 – William Otis receives a patent for the steam shovel.

Photography 

 1833 – Joseph Plateau invented an early stroboscopic device, the "phenakistoscope", which gives the illusion of a moving image.  This invention was an important precursor to cinema.
 August 1835 – H. Fox Talbot exposes the world's first known photographic negatives at Lacock Abbey in England.
 Louis Daguerre develops the daguerreotype.
 January 2, 1839 – First photo of the Moon taken by photographer Louis Daguerre 
 January 9, 1839 – The French Academy of Sciences announces the Daguerreotype photography process.
 June 22, 1839 – Louis Daguerre receives a patent for his camera (commercially available by September at the price of 400 francs).
 August 19, 1839 – The French government gives Louis Daguerre a pension and gives the daguerreotype "for the whole world".

Electricity 
Many key discoveries about electricity were made in the 1830s.  Electromagnetic induction was discovered independently by Michael Faraday and Joseph Henry in 1831; however, Faraday was the first to publish the results of his experiments. Electromagnetic induction is the production of a potential difference (voltage) across a conductor when it is exposed to a varying magnetic field.  This discovery was essential to the invention of transformers, inductors, and many types of electrical motors, generators and solenoids.

In 1834, Michael Faraday's published his research regarding the quantitative relationships in electrochemical reactions, now known as Faraday's laws of electrolysis. Also in 1834, Jean C. A. Peltier  discovered the Peltier "effect", which is the presence of heating or cooling at an electrified junction of two different conductors.  In 1836, John Daniell invented a primary cell in which hydrogen was eliminated in the generation of the electricity.

Telegraph 
 May 6, 1833 – Carl Friedrich Gauss and Wilhelm Weber obtain permission to build an electromagnetic telegraph in Göttingen.
 May 1837 – Samuel Morse patents the telegraph.
 April 9, 1839 – The world's first commercial electric telegraph line comes into operation alongside the Great Western Railway line, from Paddington Station to West Drayton.

Computers 
 June 5, 1833 – Ada Lovelace is introduced to Charles Babbage by Mary Somerville.
 1834 – Charles Babbage begins the conceptual design of an "analytical engine", a mechanical forerunner of the modern computer. It will not be built in his lifetime.

Chemistry 
 1833 – The dawn of biochemistry:  The first enzyme, diastase, is discovered by Anselme Payen.
 October 24, 1836 – The earliest United States patent for a phosphorus friction match is granted to Alonzo Dwight Phillips of Springfield, Massachusetts.
 1839 – Charles Goodyear vulcanizes rubber.

Biology 

 December 27, 1831 – Charles Darwin embarks on his historic voyage aboard .
 January 7, 1835 –  anchors off the Chonos Archipelago on the voyage of 1831–1836 with Charles Darwin.
 September 7, 1835 – Charles Darwin arrives at the Galapagos Islands aboard .
 January 12, 1836 –  with Charles Darwin reaches Sydney.
 July 20, 1836 – Charles Darwin climbs Green Hill on Ascension Island.
 October 2, 1836 – Charles Darwin returns to England aboard  with biological data he will later use to develop his theory of evolution, having left South America on August 17.
 1838 – Proteins are discovered by Jöns Jakob Berzelius.

Archaeology 
 1836 – Chatsworth Head found near Tamassos on Cyprus.
 1838 – Chatsworth Head acquired by the 6th Duke of Devonshire at Smyrna from H. P. Borrell.
 1839 – An archaeological excavation on Copan begins.

Sociology 
 July 2, 1832 – Andre-Michel Guerry presents his Essay on moral statistics of France, to the French Academy of Sciences, a significant step in the founding of empirical social science.

Transportation

Rail 
 September 15, 1830 – The Liverpool and Manchester Railway opens, the world's first intercity passenger railway operated solely by steam locomotives.
 1834 – The Wilmington and Raleigh Railroad is chartered in Wilmington, North Carolina.
 Railroad construction begins in earnest in the United States.
 May 5, 1835 – Rail transport in Belgium: a railway is opened between Brussels and Mechelen, the first in continental Europe.
 December 7, 1835 – The Bavarian Ludwig Railway opens between Nuremberg and Fürth, with a train hauled by Der Adler ("The Eagle"), the first railway in Germany.
 December 21, 1835 – The Raleigh and Gaston Railroad is chartered in Raleigh, North Carolina.
 February 8, 1836 – London and Greenwich Railway opens its first section, the first railway in London, England.
 July 13, 1836 – The first numbered  (after filing 9,957 unnumbered patents) is granted, to John Ruggles for improvements to railroad steam locomotive tires.
 July 21, 1836 – The Champlain and St. Lawrence Railroad opens between St. John and La Prairie, Quebec, the first steam-worked passenger railroad in British North America.
 October 25, 1836 – Construction begins on the Wilmington and Raleigh Railroad in North Carolina. Due to a lack of support in Raleigh, the route is revised to run from Wilmington to the Petersburg Railroad in Weldon.

Flight 
 May 24, 1832 – Francois Arban, early French balloonist makes his 1st ascent.

Automobile 
 1834 – Thomas Davenport, the inventor of the first American DC electrical motor, installs his motor in a small model car, creating one of the first electric cars.

Steamships 
 August 18, 1833 – The Canadian ship SS Royal William sets out from Pictou, Nova Scotia, on a 25-day passage of the Atlantic Ocean largely under steam to Gravesend, Kent, England.
 April 4 – April 22, 1838 – The paddle steamer SS Sirius (1837) makes the Transatlantic Crossing to New York from Cork, Ireland, in eighteen days, though not using steam continuously.
 April 8 – April 23, 1838 – Isambard Kingdom Brunel's paddle steamer SS Great Western (1838) makes the Transatlantic Crossing to New York from Avonmouth, England, in fifteen days, inaugurating a regular steamship service.

Economics 
 A period of economic prosperity in America and Europe, mainly due to increasing trade, the mass production of railroads, and the Erie Canal.
 Dutch-speaking farmers known as Voortrekkers emigrate northwards from the Cape Colony.
 The destruction of the 17th bank of the United States occurred in 1836

Popular culture

Literature
 Charles Dickens publishes his first novel The Pickwick Papers followed by Oliver Twist and Nicholas Nickleby
 January 14, 1831 – The Hunchback of Notre Dame is first published by Victor Hugo.
 1832 – Publication of the first Baedeker guidebook, Voyage du Rhin de Mayence à Cologne, in Koblenz.
 1832 – Publication begins (posthumously) of Carl von Clausewitz's Vom Kriege ("On War").
 June 10, 1834 – Thomas Carlyle moves to Cheyne Row (Carlyle's House) in London.
 August 25, 1835 – In the U.S., the New York Sun prints the first of six installments of the Great Moon Hoax.
 December 1, 1835 – Hans Christian Andersen publishes his first book of fairy tales.
 March 1836 – First monthly part of Charles Dickens' The Pickwick Papers ("The Posthumous Papers of the Pickwick Club ..., edited by Boz") published in London.
 1836 – The first printed literature in Assyrian Neo-Aramaic is produced by Justin Perkins, an American Presbyterian missionary.
 February 1837 – Charles Dickens's Oliver Twist begins publication in serial form in London.
 March 23, 1839 – The Boston Morning Post first records the use of "OK" (oll korrect).

Theatre 
 March 1, 1836 – Antonio García Gutiérrez's play El Trovador is performed for the first time in Madrid, Spain.

Music 

 December 5, 1830 – Hector Berlioz's most famous work, Symphonie Fantastique, has its world premiere in Paris.
 Richard Wagner completes his first opera, Die Feen (The Fairies).
 November 17, 1839 – Giuseppe Verdi's first opera, Oberto, conte di San Bonifacio, opens in Milan.

Sports 

 Croquet invented in Ireland.

Fashion 

 Innovations in roller printing on textiles introduced new dress fabrics.
 Broad, exaggerated sleeves for women and padded shoulders for men contrasted a narrow, idealized waist.
 Brocades come back into style.
 Low boots with elastic insets appear.
 Greatcoats, overcoats with wide sleeves, become fashionable for men to wear with day wear.

Religion 
 March 26, 1830 – The Book of Mormon is published in Palmyra, New York.
 April 6, 1830 – Joseph Smith and 5 others organize the Church of Christ (later renamed the Church of Jesus Christ of Latter Day Saints), the first formally organized church of the Latter Day Saint movement, in northwestern New York.
 February 2, 1831 – Pope Gregory XVI succeeds Pope Pius VIII as the 254th pope.
 August 7, 1831 – American Baptist minister William Miller preaches his first sermon on the Second Advent of Christ in Dresden, New York, launching the Advent Movement in the United States.
 March 24, 1832 – In Hiram, Ohio, a group of men beat, tar and feather Latter Day Saint movement founder Joseph Smith.
 October 27, 1838 – Missouri Governor Lilburn W. Boggs declares Mormons to be enemies of the state and encourages the extermination or the exile of the religious minority, forcing nearly 10,000 Mormons out of the state.
 1838 – Biblical criticism: Christian Hermann Weisse proposes the two-source hypothesis.

Disasters, natural events, and notable mishaps 

 June 29, 1833 – William Fraser Tolmie experiences an earthquake at Fort Nisqually. His journal entry records the first written eyewitness account of an earthquake in the Puget Sound region.
 November 12 – November 13, 1833 – Stars Fell on Alabama: A spectacular occurrence of the Leonid meteor shower is observed in Alabama.
 November 25, 1833 – A major 8.7 earthquake strikes Sumatra.
 October 16, 1834 – The Palace of Westminster is destroyed by fire.
 February 20, 1835 – Concepción, Chile, is destroyed by an earthquake.
 November 16, 1835 – Comet Halley reaches perihelion, its closest approach to the sun.
 December 16 – December 17, 1835 – The Great Fire of New York destroys 530 buildings, including the New York Stock Exchange.
 December 15, 1836 – The United States Patent Office burns in Washington, D.C.
 December 27, 1836 – Lewes avalanche: An avalanche at Lewes in Sussex, England, kills eight of fifteen people buried when a row of cottages is engulfed in snow.
 December 30, 1836 – In Saint Petersburg, the Lehman Theater catches fire, killing 800 people.
 January 1, 1837 – Galilee earthquake.
 December 17, 1837 – Fire in the Winter Palace, Saint Petersburg.
 January 10, 1838 – A fire destroys Lloyd's Coffee House and the Royal Exchange in London.
 September 7, 1838 – Grace Darling and her father rescue thirteen survivors from the SS Forfarshire off the Farne Islands.
 September 9, 1839 – In the Great Fire of Mobile, Alabama, hundreds of buildings are burned.
 November 25, 1839 – A disastrous cyclone slams India with terrible winds and a giant 40-foot storm surge, wiping out the port city of Coringa; 300,000 people die.

Cholera 

Historians believe that the first cholera pandemic had lingered in Indonesia and the Philippines in 1830.  The second cholera pandemic spread from India to Russia and then to the rest of Europe claiming hundreds of thousands of lives. It reached Moscow in August 1830, and by 1831, the epidemic had infiltrated Russia's main cities and towns.

Russian soldiers brought the disease to Poland during the Polish–Russian War 1830–31. "Cholera Riots" occurred in Russia, caused by the anti-cholera measures undertaken by the tsarist government.

The epidemic reached western Europe later in 1831.  In London, the disease claimed 6,536 victims; in Paris, 20,000 died (out of a population of 650,000), with about 100,000 deaths in all of France. In 1832 the epidemic reached Quebec, Ontario, and Nova Scotia, Canada; and Detroit and New York City in the United States.  It reached the Pacific coast of North America between 1832 and 1834.

Establishments 
 January 11, 1830 – LaGrange College (now the University of North Alabama) opens its doors, becoming the first publicly chartered college in Alabama.
 July 13, 1830 – The General Assembly's Institution, now the Scottish Church College, one of the pioneering institutions that ushered the Bengal Renaissance, is founded by Alexander Duff and Raja Ram Mohan Roy, in Calcutta, India.
 1830 – Austins of Derry established in Northern Ireland.  it will be the world's oldest independent department store.
 March 10, 1831 – The French Foreign Legion is founded.
 December 31, 1831 – Gramercy Park is deeded to New York City.
 April 18, 1831 – University of Alabama founded.
 1831 – Founding of Denison University in Granville, Ohio
 1831 – Founding of Wesleyan University in Middletown, Connecticut
 1831 – Founding of New York University in New York City
 1831 – Founding of Xavier University in Cincinnati, Ohio (as "The Athenaeum")
 1831 – The Sydney Morning Herald newspaper is first published.
 July 4, 1832 – The University of Durham is founded by an act of Parliament and given royal assent by King William IV.
 September – Belvedere College, Dublin, is founded by the order of the Jesuit Society of Ireland.
 October 19, 1832 – Alpha Delta Phi fraternity is founded at Hamilton College.
 November 21, 1832 – Wabash College, a small, private, liberal arts college for men, is founded.
 August 1, 1833 – King William's College on the Isle of Man officially opens.
 1833 – Foundation of Kalamazoo College in Kalamazoo, Michigan
 1833 – Foundation of Madras College, St Andrews
 1833 – Foundation of Oberlin College in Oberlin, Ohio
 March 19, 1834 – Founding of Cavendish Villa Football Club.
 November 4, 1834 – Delta Upsilon fraternity is founded at Williams College.
 1834 – Medical School of Louisiana is founded, later to become Tulane University in New Orleans.
 March 23, 1835 – The Mexican Academy of Language is established.
 June 1, 1835 – Kingston Penitentiary in Kingston, Ontario, opens.
 July 14, 1835 – Organisation of the universal Catholic Apostolic Church, initially in the U.K.
 August 28, 1835 – Castleknock College is founded by the Vincentian order in Dublin, Ireland.
 October 3, 1835 – Staedtler Company founded by J.S. Staedtler in Nuremberg, Germany.
 1835 – The British Geological Survey is founded as the world's first national geological survey.
 1835 – The Cachar Levy, forerunner of the Assam Rifles, is founded in India.
 1835 – The first Bulgarian-language school opens in the Ottoman Empire.
 1835 – Charles-Louis Havas creates Havas, the first news agency in the world (which later spawns Agence France-Presse).
 1836 – The New Board brokerage group is founded in New York City.
 February 25, 1837 – In Philadelphia, The Institute for Colored Youth (ICY) is founded as the first institution for the higher education of black people in the United States.
 March 4, 1837 – The city of Chicago is incorporated.
 1837 – At Le Mans, France, Father Basil Moreau, CSC, founds the Congregation of Holy Cross by joining the Brothers of St. Joseph and the Auxiliary Priests of Le Mans.
 November 8, 1837 – Mount Holyoke Female Seminary, later Mount Holyoke College, is founded in South Hadley, Massachusetts.
 1838 – Duke University is established in North Carolina.
 November 3, 1838 – The Bombay Times and Journal of Commerce is founded (renamed  The Times of India in 1861).
 February 11, 1839 – The University of Missouri is established, becoming the first public university west of the Mississippi River.
 March 5, 1839 – Longwood University is founded in Farmville, Virginia.
 March 7, 1839 – Baltimore City College, the third public high school in the United States, is established in Baltimore, Maryland.
 March 26, 1839 – The first Henley Royal Regatta is held.
 August 8, 1839 – The Beta Theta Pi fraternity is founded in Oxford, Ohio.
 November 11, 1839 – The Virginia Military Institute is founded in Lexington, Virginia.
 November 27, 1839 – In Boston, Massachusetts, the American Statistical Association is founded.
 1839 – Episcopal High School in Alexandria, Virginia, is founded.
 1839 – The Anti-Corn Law League is founded in Manchester.

External links
The Aftermath of the Rebellions — The Rebellions of 1837–1838 : the most dramatic political event in Canadian history

References